United Nations Security Council Resolution 131, adopted on December 9, 1958, after examining the application of the Republic of Guinea for membership in the United Nations the Council recommended to the General Assembly that the Republic of Guinea be admitted.

The resolution was adopted by ten votes with France abstaining.

See also
List of United Nations Security Council Resolutions 101 to 200 (1953–1965)

References
Text of the Resolution at undocs.org

External links
 

 0131
 0131
 0131
1958 in Guinea
December 1958 events